The afferent arterioles are a group of blood vessels that supply the nephrons in many excretory systems. They play an important role in the regulation of blood pressure as a part of the tubuloglomerular feedback mechanism.

The afferent arterioles branch from the renal artery, which supplies blood to the kidneys.

The afferent arterioles later diverge into the capillaries of the glomerulus.

Regulation
When renal blood flow is reduced (indicating hypotension) or there is a decrease in sodium or chloride ion concentration, the macula densa of the distal tubule releases prostaglandins (mainly PGI2 and PGE2) and nitric oxide, which cause the juxtaglomerular cells lining the afferent arterioles to release renin, activating the renin–angiotensin–aldosterone system, to increase blood pressure and increase reabsorption of sodium ions into the bloodstream via aldosterone.

The macula densa cell can also increase the blood pressure of the afferent arterioles by decreasing the synthesis of adenosine or ATP.

If the efferent arterioles are constricted then the blood pressure in the capillaries of the kidneys will increase.

See also
 Efferent arteriole
 Tubuloglomerular feedback
 Macula densa

Additional images

References

External links
  - "Renal Vasculature: Efferent Arterioles & Peritubular Capillaries"
  - "Mammal, renal vasculature (EM, Low)"

Kidney anatomy